Sabuhi Abdullazade (born on 18 December 2001) is an Azerbaijani professional footballer who plays as a midfielder for Sumgayit in the Azerbaijan Premier League.

Career

Club
On 2 December 2017, Abdullazade made his debut in the Azerbaijan Premier League for Sumgayit match against Kapaz.

References

External links
 

2001 births
Living people
Association football midfielders
Azerbaijani footballers
Azerbaijan under-21 international footballers
Azerbaijan youth international footballers
Azerbaijan Premier League players
Sumgayit FK players
People from Sumgait